Pike County Courthouse may refer to:

 Pike County Courthouse (Arkansas), Murfreesboro, Arkansas
 Pike County Courthouse (Georgia), Zebulon, Georgia
 Pike County Courthouse (Indiana), Petersburg, Indiana
 Pike County Courthouse (Mississippi), Holmesville, Mississippi, a Mississippi Landmark
 Pike County Courthouse (Pennsylvania), Milford, Pennsylvania